Pio Alika Sagapolutele (November 28, 1969 – June 7, 2009) was an American football defensive tackle who played seven seasons in the National Football League for the Cleveland Browns, the New England Patriots, and the New Orleans Saints. He started in Super Bowl XXXI for the New England Patriots. He played college football at San Diego State University.

He was born in American Samoa and died of an aneurysm on June 7, 2009, in Chandler, Arizona where he lived. Following his death his wife sued the National Football League and football helmet maker Riddell Inc. alleging that his death was caused by brain injuries.

References 

1969 births
2009 deaths
American football defensive linemen
American sportspeople of Samoan descent
San Diego State Aztecs football players
Cleveland Browns players
New England Patriots players
New Orleans Saints players
Deaths from aneurysm
Sportspeople from Chandler, Arizona
Players of American football from American Samoa